The Bubble Act 1720 (also Royal Exchange and London Assurance Corporation Act 1719) was an Act of the Parliament of Great Britain passed on 11 June 1720 that incorporated the Royal Exchange Assurance Corporation and London Assurance Corporation, but more significantly forbade the formation of any other  joint-stock companies unless approved by royal charter.

Its provisions were extended later by the Bubble Schemes, Colonies, Act 1740 to include its colonies, particularly Massachusetts.

The act gave the South Sea Company a monopoly over British trade with South America until the South Sea Bubble "popped" in Britain's first major stock market collapse.

Background
Various motivations have been suggested for the Act. They include the desire to prevent the speculation that produced the contemporary South Sea Bubble, an attempt to prevent smaller non-charter companies from forming and so reduce the importance of Parliament in regulating businesses; or the South Sea Company itself wanting to prevent other bubbles from forming that might have decreased the intensity of its own.

Recent scholarship indicates that the last was the cause: it was passed to prevent other companies from competing with the South Sea Company for investors' capital.

In fact, the Act was passed in June 1720, before the peak of the bubble. The Act was repealed in 1825.

Contents
The Act declared "illegal and void" all business that raised money or offered shares in the manner of a chartered company without a charter from the royal government. Under the terms of the act, the Royal Exchange Assurance Corporation and the London Assurance Corporation were granted charters to write marine insurance. Until 1824, they remained the only joint-stock firms with such a charter.

See also
  - the only prosecution brought under the Act which, according to L.C.B. Gower, "decided nothing of importance".

References

Further reading
 

Great Britain Acts of Parliament 1720
Repealed Great Britain Acts of Parliament
South Sea Bubble
1720 in economics
Economic history of the United Kingdom